The 2019–20 season was the 105th season of the Isthmian League, which is an English football competition featuring semi-professional and amateur clubs from London, East and South East England. This was the second season to consist of four divisions after the league reorganised the former South Division into the new South Central and South East divisions. 

As a result of the COVID-19 pandemic, this season's competition was formally abandoned on 26 March 2020, with all results from the season being expunged, and no promotion or relegation taking place to, from, or within the competition. On 30 March 2020, sixty-six non-league clubs sent an open letter to the Football Association requesting that they reconsider their decision. A legal appeal against the decision, funded by South Shields of the Northern Premier League, was dismissed in June 2020.

Premier Division

The Premier Division consisted of 22 clubs, including 17 clubs from the previous season, and five new clubs:
Bowers & Pitsea, promoted from the North Division
Cheshunt, promoted from the South Central Division
Cray Wanderers, promoted from the South East Division
East Thurrock United, relegated from the National League South
Horsham, promoted from the South East Division

League table

Results table

Stadia and locations

North Division

North Division consisted of 20 clubs, 17 clubs from the previous season, and three new clubs:
Cambridge City, transferred from the Southern Football League Division One Central
Histon, promoted from the Eastern Counties League
Hullbridge Sports, promoted from the Essex Senior League

League table
</onlyinclude>

Results table

Stadia and locations

South Central Division

South Central Division consisted of 20 clubs, 16 clubs from the previous season, and four new clubs:
Barking, transferred from the North Division
Chertsey Town, promoted from the Combined Counties League
Harlow Town, relegated from the Premier Division
Staines Town, relegated from the Southern Football League Premier Division South

League table

Results table

Stadia and locations

South East Division

South East Division consisted of 20 clubs, 16 clubs from the previous season, and four new clubs:
Burgess Hill Town, relegated from the Premier Division
Chichester City, promoted from the Southern Combination League
Cray Valley Paper Mills, promoted from the Southern Counties East League
Whitehawk, relegated from the Premier Division

League table

Results table

Stadia and locations

League Cup

The 2019–20 Alan Turvey Trophy (formerly the Isthmian League Cup) is the 46th season of the Alan Turvey Trophy, the cup competition of the whole Isthmian League. It was the first season when group stage was introduced.

Calendar

Group stage
57 clubs from the North Division, South East Division and South Central Division entered at this stage, while Guernsey, Whitehawk and Dereham Town decided not to participate.

Group 1

Group 2

Group 3

Group 4

Group 5

Group 6

Group 7

Group 8

Group 9

Group 10

First round
Ten group winners were entered into the draw with twenty-two clubs from the Premier Division, making thirty-two clubs.

Second round

Quarter-finals

Semi-finals

Semifinals were scheduled for 17 March, but were never played as the season was stopped and finally abandoned on 26 March due to COVID-19 pandemic.

See also
Isthmian League
2019–20 Northern Premier League
2019–20 Southern Football League

References

External links
Official website

2019–20
7
Eng
Isthmian League